Schwaan station is a railway station in the municipality of Schwaan, located in the Rostock district in Mecklenburg-Vorpommern, Germany.

References

Railway stations in Mecklenburg-Western Pomerania
Rostock S-Bahn stations
Buildings and structures in Rostock (district)
Railway stations in Germany opened in 1850